The Bust of Antonio Cepparelli is a sculptural portrait bust by the Italian artist Gian Lorenzo Bernini. It was executed around 1622. It is in the museum of the church of San Giovanni dei Fiorentini in Rome.

See also
List of works by Gian Lorenzo Bernini

Notes

References

External links
 

Monuments and memorials in Rome
Busts by Gian Lorenzo Bernini
1620s sculptures
Marble sculptures in Italy